The Technoflug Piccolo is a German high-wing, T-tailed, single-seat motor glider that was designed and produced by Technoflug of Schramberg. It first flew in 1980.

Design and development
The Piccolo motorglider was the company's premier product, followed up by the Technoflug Carat, a touring motorglider.

The Piccolo is built from composites. The pusher configuration engine is mounted behind the cockpit and above the tail boom. The propeller is a three-bladed design which folds by aerodynamic drag for soaring flight, extending by centrifugal effect on engine start. The landing gear is of tricycle configuration and features optional wheel pants to reduce drag. The wings fold for storage and ground transport.

When the Piccolo was available in 2003 the price was US$29,266 for a complete aircraft. The company no longer produces whole aircraft and now provides contracted parts manufacture, computer-aided design and engineering services to other companies.

Specifications (Piccolo)

See also

References

External links

Company website

1990s German sailplanes
Motor gliders
Single-engined pusher aircraft
Aircraft first flown in 1980
High-wing aircraft